Gavella may refer to:

Branko Gavella (1885–1962), Croatian theatre director
Gavella Drama Theatre, theatre house in Zagreb, Croatia, established in 1953
Gavella House, historic building in Zagreb located on Ban Jelačić Square built in 1889 and designed by Kuno Waidmann